Burlington is a city in Alamance and Guilford counties in the U.S. state of North Carolina. It is the principal city of the Burlington, North Carolina Metropolitan Statistical Area, which encompasses all of Alamance County, in which most of the city is located, and is a part of the Greensboro-Winston-Salem-High Point CSA. The population was 57,303 at the 2020 census, which makes Burlington the 18th largest city in North Carolina.

History
Alamance County was created when Orange County was partitioned in 1849. Early settlers included several groups of Quakers, many of which remain active in the Snow Camp area, German farmers, and Scots-Irish immigrants.

The need of the North Carolina Railroad in the 1850s to locate land where they could build, repair and do maintenance on its track was the genesis of Burlington, North Carolina. The company selected a piece of land slightly west of present-day Graham. On January 29, 1856, the last spikes were driven into the final tie of the North Carolina Railroad project, uniting the cities of Goldsboro and Charlotte by rail. The next day, the first locomotive passed along the new route. When the iron horse arrived in Alamance County, locals referred to it as "the eighth wonder of the world".

Not long after this historic opening, the railroad realized a pressing need for repair shops. With Alamance County's position along the new line, it became the logical choice for the shops' location. After several debates concerning where the shops would be located, Gen. Benjamin Trollinger, a progressive Alamance County manufacturer, made an offer that settled the matter. Gen. Trollinger owned land just northwest of Graham, and he convinced several other prominent citizens owning adjacent lots to join him and sell their property to the railroad. 57 buildings were constructed between 1855 and 1859, including structures for engine and machine shops, carpentry, blacksmithing, houses for workers and railway officials, and company headquarters. For a brief period, railroad directors changed the name of official name of "Company Shops" to "Vance" (1863–1864), but the town returned to the "Company Shops" moniker in July 1864, and officially incorporating as Company Shops in 1866. Thirty-nine white men and two free African-Americans were employed in or around the shops, with twenty enslaved individuals constrained to assist. Sale of town lots soon started, but not surprisingly, the sale of lots was slow until after the Civil War. By 1864, Company Shops numbered about 300 persons.

Through a series of leases and mergers, the railroad was leased to Richmond & Danville Railroad (1871), working as part of the Pennsylvania Railroad, and in 1893, the North Carolina Railroad was folded into the Southern Railway system. Following the leasing of the railroad to Richmond & Danville, many of the railroad jobs transferred to Richmond and Manchester. With the railroad shops no longer operated there, the citizens of Company Shops decided a new name was needed.  In February 1887, a contest was held to decide a name, and one person submitted the name "Burlington" after seeing it on a passing train. An appointed committee for the town selected the name, and the name was officially changed through North Carolina State Legislature.

Around the turn of the century, E.  M. Holt established small textile operations along the Haw River and Great Alamance Creek. In 1908, E. M. Holt built the first cotton mill in the South. From the establishment of this single factory, Alamance County grew to eventually operate 30 cotton mills and 10 to 15 yarn manufacturing plants employing 15,000 people. Eventually, the early textile venture of E. M. Holt became known all over the world as Burlington Industries, and is now headquartered in nearby Greensboro. Throughout this period, Burlington became a prosperous and vibrant little city filled with schools, churches, newspapers, telegraph and telephone lines, roads and a streetcar lineall in keeping with the latest "modern progress" of the times.

Though textiles continued to dominate the local economy well into the 1970s, the people of Burlington knew they could not survive with only one industry. The country's involvement in World War II brought important local economic changes. In 1942, the federal government purchased and leased a  site to Fairchild Aircraft Corporation for the construction of test aircraft. After two years of production, the site was leased to Firestone Tire Company for the Army's tank rebuilding program. At the close of the war, the federal government chose not to leave, but to utilize the property for government contract business. This decision would bring Western Electric to town along with new employees from around the country. Their contracts ensured Burlington's participation during the Cold War manufacturing and testing of emerging defense technologies. Four decades later (1991), however, the doors to Western Electric (then AT&T Federal Systems Division) were locked, and another chapter of Burlington's history was over.

During this century-and-a-half of economic change, Burlington grew, adapted and prospered. Originally the center of commerce for Company Shops, the downtown area still serves as the heart of today's community with financial services, government services, an expanded library, small shops, eateries and a restored theater. Downtown has also returned to its status as a major employment center, becoming the home to Laboratory Corporation of America, one of the world's largest biomedical testing firms and Burlington/Alamance County's largest employer.

The Alamance Hotel, Allen House, Atlantic Bank and Trust Company Building, Beverly Hills Historic District, Downtown Burlington Historic District, East Davis Street Historic District, Efird Building, First Baptist Church, First Christian Church of Burlington, Polly Fogleman House, Holt-Frost House, Horner Houses, Lakeside Mills Historic District, McCray School, Menagerie Carousel, Moore-Holt-White House, South Broad-East Fifth Streets Historic District, Southern Railway Passenger Station, St. Athanasius Episcopal Church and Parish House and the Church of the Holy Comforter, Stagg House, Sunny Side, US Post Office, West Davis Street-Fountain Place Historic District, and Windsor Cotton Mills Office are listed on the National Register of Historic Places.

Geography

Burlington is located at  (36.089636, -79.445578).

Located in the Piedmont region of North Carolina, Burlington is characterized as having mostly flat land with a few rolling hills.

Climate
The climate in this area is characterized by relatively high temperatures and evenly distributed precipitation throughout the year.  According to the Köppen Climate Classification system, Burlington has a Humid subtropical climate, abbreviated "Cfa" on climate maps.

Parks and sports
There are a variety of parks that can be found in Burlington, including Joe Davidson Park and the Burlington City Park. Upon visiting these parks one can find a variety of things for various activities, such as baseball fields, basketball courts, soccer fields, playgrounds, disc golf and tennis courts.

The Alamance County Recreation and Parks Commission is composed of seven citizen volunteers and one representative from both the Alamance-Burlington Board of Education and the Alamance County Board of Commissioners. ACRPD Mission Statement: The Alamance County Recreation and Parks Department will provide parks, trails and programs that inspire visitors and welcome all participants.

The Alamance County Recreation and Parks Department manages parks and community centers at the following locations:
Cedarock Park
Shallow Ford Natural Area
Great Bend Park at Glencoe
Pleasant Grove Recreation Center
Eli Whitney Recreation Center

Alamance County offers many hiking and paddle opportunities including the Haw River Trail and the NC Mountains-to-Sea Trail.  The Alamance County Recreation and Parks Department manages accesses to the Haw River Paddle and Hiking Trail at the following locations:

Altamahaw Paddle Access
Shallow Ford Natural Area
Great Bend Park at Glencoe
Glencoe Paddle Access
Saxapahaw Lake Paddle Access
Saxapahaw Mill Race Paddle Access

The Burlington Sock Puppets, members of the Appalachian League, a wood-bat collegiate summer league, play their home games at Burlington Athletic Stadium in Fairchild Park. They were previously known as the Burlington Royals from 2007–2020. The Royals were rebranded as the Sock Puppets following the contraction and reorganization of minor league baseball prior to the 2021 season. 2021 was the inaugural season for the revamped Appalachian League and the Sock Puppets. Prior to being known as the Royals, the team was also known as the Burlington Indians from 1986–2006. Several current and former MLB players began their careers in Burlington, including Jim Thome, CC Sabathia, Manny Ramirez, and Bartolo Colon

The city of Burlington also operates the nearby Indian Valley Municipal Golf Course.

The flagship of the Burlington Parks System, City Park offers more than 75 acres of activities for the entire family. It serves as the home of an amusement area consisting of a carousel, miniature train, boat and car ride, playground, amphitheater, baseball field, picnic shelters, and walking trails. A fully restored Dentzel Carousel is the highlight of the amusement area. As part of the National Historical Register, the carousel attracts thousands of visitors yearly. The Burlington Carousel Festival, is held each September in the park, except for 2018 when it was cancelled due to adverse weather conditions associated with Hurricane Florence. Throughout the spring and summer the park comes alive with an Easter egg hunt, a concert series, and baseball and softball tournaments. The park is located one mile from Downtown Burlington on South Church Street.

Demographics

2020 census

As of the 2020 United States census, there were 57,303 people, 22,009 households, and 12,978 families residing in the city.

2010 census
As of the census of 2010, there were 49,963 people, 20,632 households, and 12,679 families residing in the city. The population density was 1,967.0 people per square mile (760.5/km2). There were 23,414 housing units at an average density of 921.8 per square mile (356.4/km2). The racial makeup of the city was 57.6% White, 28% African American, 0.7% Native American, 2.1% Asian, 0.1% Pacific Islander, 9.2% from other races, and 2.4% from two or more races. Hispanic or Latino of any race were 16% of the population.

There were 20,632 households, out of which 28.1% had children under the age of 18 living with them, 38.9% were married couples living together, 17.5% had a female householder with no husband present, and 38.5% were non-families. 33% of all households were made up of individuals, and 13.1% had someone living alone who was 65 years of age or older. The average household size was 2.38 and the average family size was 3.01.

In the city, the population was spread out, with 26.6% under the age of 20, 6.5% from 20 to 24, 26.1% from 25 to 44, 25.2% from 45 to 64, and 15.7% who were 65 years of age or older. The average age was 38.3 years.

The median income for a household in the city was $42,097, and the median income for a family was $49,797. The per capita income for the city was $23,465. About 15.9% of families and 19.6% of the population were below the poverty line, including 34.9% of those under age 18 and 10.2% of those age 65 or over.

K-12 education
The local school system is known as the Alamance-Burlington School System, which was created by a merger between the Alamance County School System and the Burlington City School System in 1996.

Elementary 
 Alexander Wilson Elementary School
 Altamahaw-Ossipee Elementary School
 R. Homer Andrews Elementary School
 Eastlawn Elementary School
 Elon Elementary School
 Audrey W. Garrett Elementary School
 Grove Park Elementary School
 Haw River Elementary School
 Highland Elementary School
 Hillcrest Elementary School
 E. M. Holt Elementary School
 B. Everett Jordan Elementary School
 Harvey R. Newlin Elementary School
 North Graham Elementary School
 Pleasant Grove Elementary School
 Marvin B. Smith Elementary School
 South Graham Elementary School
 South Mebane Elementary School
 Sylvan Elementary School
 E. M. Yoder Elementary School

Middle 
 Broadview Middle School
 Graham Middle School
 Hawfields Middle School
 Southern Middle School
 Turrentine Middle School
 Western Alamance Middle School
 Woodlawn Middle School

High 
 Hugh M. Cummings High School
 Eastern Alamance High School
 Graham High School
 Southern Alamance High School
 Western Alamance High School
 Walter M. Williams High School

Independent 

 Alamance Christian School
 Blessed Sacrament School
 Burlington Christian Academy
 The Burlington School

Charter 

 River Mill Academy
 Clover Garden School

Other 

 Alamance-Burlington Early College
 Career and Technical Education Center
 Sellars-Gunn Education Center
ABSS Virtual School

Higher education
Alamance Community College (part of the public North Carolina Community College System) has campuses in Burlington and nearby Graham, offering multiple academic programs and specialized career training.  Elon University (a private 4-year university) is in nearby Elon.  Additionally, a number of colleges and universities are a short drive away in Greensboro.

Transportation
Amtrak's Piedmont train connects Burlington to Raleigh, Durham, Charlotte, Greensboro, and other points in central North Carolina. The Carolinian train continues to New York with intermediate stops including Richmond, Washington, Baltimore, and Philadelphia. The Amtrak station is situated at 101 North Main Street.

Burlington opened its first public transit service, Link Transit, on June 6, 2016. As of September 21, 2017, more than 100,000 people have used the service. In addition, transportation services are available to its residents through the Alamance County Transportation Authority.  Locals can also ride the BioBus from nearby Elon University.

Burlington is about 35 miles from the Piedmont Triad International Airport in Greensboro and about 48 miles from Raleigh-Durham International Airport in Morrisville. In addition Burlington is served by both Interstate 40, Interstate 85 and US 70.

Business

 LabCorp has its headquarters and several testing facilities in Burlington. LabCorp is Alamance County's largest employer, employing over 3,000 people in the county.
Honda Aero, a subsidiary of Honda, recently announced that it will move its corporate headquarters to Burlington and build a $27 million plant at the Burlington-Alamance Regional Airport where it will build its HF120 jet engines for use in very light jets.
Glen Raven Inc., a fabric manufacturing and marketing company. Sunbrella is Glen Raven, Inc.'s flagship brand.
Biscuitville, a regional fast food chain, is based in Burlington.
Gold Toe Brands, a manufacturer of socks.
The Times-News is Burlington's only daily newspaper, and the area's dominant media outlet.
Zack's Hotdogs, a local restaurant opened by Zack Touloupas in 1928 is located in the revitalized downtown area.

Shopping

The city's only indoor mall, Holly Hill Mall, is located at the intersection of Huffman Mill Road and Church Street (US 70). An outdoor mall, Alamance Crossing, opened in 2007 at Interstate 40/85 and University Drive. Most shopping, restaurants and services can be found on Huffman Mill Road and Church Street (US 70). Just off I-85/40 at Exit 145 is North Carolina's original outlet mall, the Burlington Outlet Village (formerly known as the BMOC).

Notable people
Billy Bryan, former NFL center 
Josh Bush, former NFL free safety 
Jesse Branson former NBA player
Chris Castor, former NFL wide receiver
Drew Coble, former American League umpire
Geoff Crompton, former NBA player
Max Drake (born 1952), musician; born in Burlington
William Edward Ellis, Vice admiral in the United States Navy
Andrew Everett, professional wrestler
Frank Haith, college basketball head coach, Missouri, Miami, Tulsa; grew up in Burlington
Charley Jones, former MLB player
Dwight Jones, former University of North Carolina and NFL wide receiver 
Sammy Johnson, former NFL running back
Don Kernodle, born in Burlington, five-time NWA champion and tag team partner of Sgt Slaughter; appeared in Paradise Alley with Sylvester Stallone
Blanche Taylor Moore, convicted murderer, whose life story was portrayed in the television movie "Black Widow: The Blanche Taylor Moore Story", starring Elizabeth Montgomery
Danny Morrison, former president of the Carolina Panthers
Will Richardson, NFL offensive lineman
Tequan Richmond, born in Burlington, stars as Drew Rock in Everybody Hates Chris, and played a young Ray Charles in the movie Ray
W. Kerr Scott, Governor of North Carolina from 1949 to 1953, U. S. senator (Class 2) from 1954 to 1958
Brandon Spoon, former NFL middle linebacker for the Buffalo Bills
Brandon Tate, former NFL wide receiver, holds NCAA career record for most combined return yards (3,523)
Floyd Wicker, former MLB player

Sister cities
Burlington has two sister cities, as designated by Sister Cities International:
 Gwacheon, Gyeonggi-do, South Korea
 Soledad de Graciano Sánchez, San Luis Potosí, Mexico

See also 
 List of municipalities in North Carolina

References

External links

 
 
 Burlington/Alamance County Convention & Visitors Bureau

 
Cities in North Carolina
Cities in Alamance County, North Carolina
Cities in Guilford County, North Carolina
Populated places established in 1857
1857 establishments in North Carolina